Harrinkrunni is a Swedish island belonging to the Haparanda archipelago. The island is located 13 kilometres south of the town Haparanda. The island has no shore connection and no buildings.

References 

Swedish islands in the Baltic
Islands of Norrbotten County